The palespotted eel (Ophichthus puncticeps) is an eel in the family Ophichthidae (worm/snake eels). It was described by Johann Jakob Kaup in 1859, originally under the genus Cryptopterus. It is a marine, tropical eel which is known from the western Atlantic Ocean, including North Carolina, USA, the northeastern Gulf of Mexico, and Brazil.

References

Taxa named by Johann Jakob Kaup
Fish described in 1859
Ophichthus